Qayen can refer to:
 Qayen, Iran
 Ghayen County, Iran
 Saffron, produced in Qayen, Iran
 Cain, as depicted in Rastafarian translations of the Bible